Asiru Phat'jata (Aymara asiru snake, phat'jaña to split in half, -ta a suffix to indicate the participle, "split snake") is a hill in Peru, situated at a height of about . It is located in the Puno Region, Yunguyo Province, Yunguyo District. Asiru Phat'jata lies near Lake Titicaca at the road which connects Yunguyo and Puno, south of the village Asiru Phat'jata (Acero Patjata) and north of the mountain Qhapiya.

On the hill there is an archaeological area. It was declared a National Cultural Heritage (Patrimonio Cultural) of Peru by the National Institute of Culture.

Gallery

References 

Mountains of Peru
Archaeological sites in Peru
Mountains of Puno Region